The 1931 Washington Senators won 92 games, lost 62, and finished in third place in the American League. They were managed by Walter Johnson and played home games at Griffith Stadium.

Offseason 
 January 13, 1931: Harry Rice was selected off waivers by the Senators from the New York Yankees.

Regular season

Season standings

Record vs. opponents

Notable transactions 
 July 29, 1931: Harry Rice was purchased from the Senators by the Baltimore Orioles.

Roster

Player stats

Batting

Starters by position 
Note: Pos = Position; G = Games played; AB = At bats; H = Hits; Avg. = Batting average; HR = Home runs; RBI = Runs batted in

Other batters 
Note: G = Games played; AB = At bats; H = Hits; Avg. = Batting average; HR = Home runs; RBI = Runs batted in

Pitching

Starting pitchers 
Note: G = Games pitched; IP = Innings pitched; W = Wins; L = Losses; ERA = Earned run average; SO = Strikeouts

Other pitchers 
Note: G = Games pitched; IP = Innings pitched; W = Wins; L = Losses; ERA = Earned run average; SO = Strikeouts

Relief pitchers 
Note: G = Games pitched; W = Wins; L = Losses; SV = Saves; ERA = Earned run average; SO = Strikeouts

Farm system 

Hagerstown club transferred and renamed twice: to Parkersburg, June 28, and to Youngstown, July 12, 1931

Notes

External links 
1931 Washington Senators at Baseball-Reference
1931 Washington Senators team page at www.baseball-almanac.com

Minnesota Twins seasons
Washington Senators season
Wash